Sperchonopsis is a genus of mites belonging to the family Sperchontidae.

The species of this genus are found in Europe and Northern America.

Species:
 Sperchonopsis phreaticus Biesiadka, 1975

References

Trombidiformes
Trombidiformes genera